NGC 6052 is a pair of galaxies in the constellation of Hercules. It was discovered on 11 June 1784 by William Herschel. It was described as "faint, pretty large, irregularly round" by John Louis Emil Dreyer, the compiler of the New General Catalogue.

The two components of NGC 6052 are designated NGC 6052A and NGC 6052B, respectively. The two, attracted by each other's gravity, have collided and are interacting with each other. NGC 6052 is currently in a late stage of merging, where the shape of the two galaxies is not distinctly defined.

SN 1982aa, a powerful radio supernova, was detected in NGC 6052.

Gallery

See also
 Hercules (Chinese astronomy)
 List of largest galaxies
 List of nearest galaxies
 List of NGC objects (6001–7000)

References

Notes

External links
 

209
6052
10182
57039
Interacting galaxies
Luminous infrared galaxies
Hercules (constellation)